Dr. Petrus Molemela Stadium, formerly known as Seisa Ramabodu Stadium, is a multi-purpose stadium located in Bloemfontein, South Africa.  It is currently used mostly for football matches and was utilized as a training field for teams participating in the 2010 FIFA World Cup after being renovated in 2008 and brought up to FIFA standards.

It was the home stadium of Bloemfontein Celtic who also used the Free State Stadium. During three-year renovations completed in 2015, the stadium's capacity was expanded from 18,000 to 22,000.

References

External links
Stadium picture
Photos of Stadiums in South Africa at cafe.daum.net/stade

Buildings and structures in Bloemfontein
Soccer venues in South Africa
Sports venues in the Free State (province)
Sports venues completed in 1982
1982 establishments in South Africa